The Blair Congregational Church in Blair, Nebraska is a Carpenter Gothic church that has been listed on the National Register of Historic Places since 1979. It is affiliated with the United Church of Christ.

The church was founded in 1870.  The building was constructed in 1874 by local builder George Sutherland, according to a design by Omaha architect Charles F. Driscoll whose plans won out over architect A. Roberts, each of whom received $25 for their submissions.  Carpenter Gothic style is rare in the state, and this is believed to be the only non-Episcopalian church example. (Architect Richard Upjohn popularized the style for rural Episcopalian churches.) It was renovated and extended in 1884, 1908, and 1957.

Driscoll also designed the NRHP-listed Ideal Steam Laundry, in Fremont, Nebraska.

References

External links

Churches completed in 1874
Churches on the National Register of Historic Places in Nebraska
Buildings and structures in Washington County, Nebraska
Congregational churches in Nebraska
National Register of Historic Places in Washington County, Nebraska